The Monument to Vladimir Vysotsky is a bronze monument installed and opened in the summer of 2014 in Rostov-on-Don on Pushkinskaya Street.

History
In 2009, the Fund-raising for the creation of the monument to Vladimir Vysotsky was organized and started. A competition was held, as a result of which the sculptors presented several projects of the work, among which the winner was the project of Anatoly Sknarin. A special group of Rostov residents was engaged in fundraising: containers for donations were installed in many places of the city. Charity concerts were also held. As a result, 500 thousand rubles were collected from the necessary amount of 2.5 million rubles. Most of the missing amount for the creation of the monument was allocated by the charity Fund of the famous Rostov businessman Ivan Savvidi.

The opening of the memorial took place on July 25, 2014, the day of the 34th anniversary of the death of the poet, not far from the House of Cinema in Pushkinskaya Street. The height of the entire composition is 3.4 meters, of which 2.3 meters is the sculpture of the actor. The monument was made of bronze: Vysotsky stands on stage in sweater and trousers, in his hands – a guitar. To the right of the actor is a curtain. According to other information, on the right is also a lightning – a symbol of the bright and short life of the poet.

At the opening of the monument Vladimir Vysotsky was attended by about 200 townspeople.

In the city, in addition to the monument to Vysotsky, memorial plaques are installed in places that the artist attended.

References 

Tourist attractions in Rostov-on-Don
Monuments and memorials in Rostov-on-Don